Acesander (Greek ) wrote a history of Cyrene.  Plutarch speaks of a work of his respecting Libya, which may possibly be the same work as the history of Cyrene.  The time at which he lived is unknown.

References

Ancient Greek historians known only from secondary sources